Thomas Hayes "Tom" Davenport, Jr. (born October 17, 1954) is an American academic and author specializing in analytics, business process innovation, knowledge management, and artificial intelligence. He is currently the President’s Distinguished Professor in Information Technology and Management at Babson College, a Fellow of the MIT Initiative on the Digital Economy, Co-founder of the International Institute for Analytics, and a Senior Advisor to Deloitte Analytics.

Davenport has written, coauthored, or edited twenty books, including the first books on analytical competition, business process reengineering and achieving value from enterprise systems, and the best seller, Working Knowledge (with Larry Prusak), on knowledge management. He has written more than one hundred articles for such publications as Harvard Business Review, MIT Sloan Management Review, California Management Review, the Financial Times, and many other publications. Davenport has also been a columnist for The Wall Street Journal, CIO, InformationWeek, and Forbes magazines.

In 2003, Davenport was named one of the world’s 'Top 25 Consultants' by Consulting magazine, and in 2005 was named one of the world’s top three analysts of business and technology by readers of Optimize magazine. In 2012 he was named one of the world's "Top 50 Business School Professors" by Poets and Quants and Fortune Magazine.

One of his most popular books (coauthored with Jeanne Harris), Competing on Analytics: The New Science of Winning, provides guidelines for basing competitive strategies on the analysis of business data, and highlights several firms that do so.

One of his sons, Hayes Davenport, is a television comedy writer and podcaster living in Los Angeles.
His other son, Chase Davenport, makes surfboards and researches artificial intelligence in San Francisco.

Education

Davenport initially trained as a sociologist, with a BA in Sociology from Trinity University in 1976, a Master's degree in Sociology from Harvard in 1979, and a Ph.D. in Sociology from Harvard in 1980.

Career 

After graduating with a Ph.D. in Sociology, Davenport worked as an academic before being offered a research and consulting job at Index by James Champy.  Davenport became Director of research at Index, studying business process improvement.  Part of this research was a multiclient research program that Index and Hammer operated across an industry research consortium called PRISM – Partnership for Research in Information Systems Management. Davenport was the program director. In 1988 PRISM interviewed 100 companies on the ways information technology could improve cross-functional processes, and Business process re-engineering emerged from this research.

Following CSC Index's work with business process engineering, Davenport made contributions to knowledge management and the attention economy before moving on to contribute in the areas of data analytics and artificial intelligence. 

Davenport's career experience, in addition to being a professor and consultant, included directing research centres for Accenture and Ernst & Young. 

Davenport is currently President's Distinguished Professor of Information Technology & Management at Babson College.

Analytics 3.0 
Writing for the Harvard Business Review, Davenport provides a summary of the three analytics maturity levels of any organization. Analytics 1.0 organizations are those where management has acquired the ability to rely on internal data for decision making, rather than mere intuition. However, these organizations still rely on systems and processes that are inefficient, requiring an extraordinary amount of time to enable analysis to take place. Analytics 2.0 companies combine internal data with externally sourced data, offering predictive capabilities. Davenport notes that this “big data” evolution was predominantly driven by Internet firms with capabilities to work with large amounts of data.

According to Davenport, we now find ourselves in the third analytics era where companies of any industry are increasingly “competing on analytics”. The premise is that the many activities an Analytics 3.0 firm might conduct generate data trails that can be collected and subsequently analyzed. These datasets can then be used to create and capture incremental value by providing the necessary input for much more accurate decision making. But more significantly, such analytics capabilities are now a fundamental driver in the creation of increasingly valuable products and services. Indeed, Davenport argues that in many instances analytical power is now built into the product and service itself.

Bibliography (partial)

See also

Attention economy
Attention management
Business analytics
Information ecology
Knowledge management

References

External links

 Thomas H. Davenport's homepage
 Davenport’s Babson College Profile
 Davenport's Biography with the International Institute for Analytics

Living people
1954 births
Babson College faculty
Harvard University alumni
Place of birth missing (living people)
Information systems researchers